Juan Fernández may refer to:

Arts and entertainment
Juan Fernández Navarrete (1526–1579), Spanish mannerist painter
Juan Fernández el Labrador (died 1657), Spanish painter
Juan Fernández de Rojas (1750–1819), Spanish writer and humorist
Juan Fernández de Alarcon (born 1956), actor from the Dominican Republic
Juan Fernández Mejías (born 1957), Spanish actor known from La mala educación and 7 días al desnudo
Juan Carlos Fernández-Nieto (born 1987), Spanish-American pianist

Politics and law
Juan Fernández de Olivera (1560–1612), governor of Spanish Florida
Juan Mora Fernández (1784–1854), Costa Rica's first elected head of state
Juan Manuel Fernández de Jaúregui (1814–1871), Mexican acting governor of Querétaro
Juan Fernández Sánchez Navarro (born 1977), Mexican politician

Religion
Juan Fernández Temiño (died 1556), Spanish Roman Catholic bishop
Juan Fernández (missionary) (c. 1526 – 1567), Spanish Jesuit lay brother and missionary
Juan Fernández de Rosillo (1533–1606), Spanish Roman Catholic bishop
Juan Jacobo Fernandez (1808–1860), Spanish Franciscan friar
Juan María Fernández y Krohn (born c.  1948), Spanish Catholic priest, who tried to assassinate Pope John Paul II in 1982

Sports

Association football (soccer)
Juan Fernández (footballer, born 1938), Spanish footballer
Juan Fernández (footballer, born 1946), Spanish footballer
Juan Carlos Fernández (footballer) (born 1946), Bolivian footballer
Juan Fernández Segui (born 1947), Spanish football manager
Juan Fernández Marín (born 1957), Spanish football referee
Juan Fernández Di Alessio (born 1975), Argentine footballer
Juan Fernández (footballer, born 1980), Argentine football defender
Juan Fernando Fernández (born 1989), Mexican footballer
Juan Fernández (footballer, born 1999), Spanish footballer

Other sports
Juan Fernández (racing driver) (1930–2020), Spanish racing driver
Juan Manuel Fernández Ochoa (born 1951), Spanish alpine skier
Juan Fernández (cyclist) (born 1957), Spanish road racing cyclist
Juan Fernández (biathlete) (born 1963), Argentine Olympic biathlete
Juan Fernández Miranda (born 1974), Argentine rugby player
Juan Carlos Fernández (born 1976), Colombian weightlifter
Juan Martín Fernández Lobbe (born 1981), Argentine rugby union footballer
Juan Fernández La Villa (born 1985), Spanish Olympic field hockey player
Juan Pablo Fernández (born 1988), Argentine handball player
Juan Fernández (basketball) (born 1990), Argentine basketball player

Others
Juan Fernández de Heredia ( – 1396), Grand Master of the Knights Hospitaller
Juan Fernández de Híjar y Cabrera (1419–1491), Spanish noble
Juan Fernández Ladrillero (c. 1490–1559), Spanish explorer 
Juan Fernández (explorer) ( – ), Spanish explorer
Juan Fernández de Velasco y Tovar, 5th Duke of Frías ( – 1613), Spanish nobleman and diplomat
Juan Manuel Fernández Pacheco, 8th Duke of Escalona (1650–1725), Spanish aristocrat and academician

Other uses
Gimnasio Juan Fernández Albarrán, Mexican basketball arena
Juan Fernández firecrown, a hummingbird
Juan Fernández fur seal, a seal from the Juan Fernández Islands
Juan Fernández hotspot, a volcanic hotspot
Juan Fernández Islands, an island group off the coast of Chile
Juan Fernández petrel, Chilean seabird
Juan Fernández Plate, a tectonic plate
Juan Fernández Ridge, a volcanic island and seamount chain
Juan Fernández tit-tyrant, Chilean bird species

See also
John Fernandez (disambiguation)

Fernandez, Juan